Senegalia sakalava is a species of Senegalia that is endemic to Madagascar.  Two varieties are recognised:
Senegalia sakalava var. hispida Villiers & Du Puy
Senegalia sakalava var. sakalava

The species occurs in the provinces of Fianarantsoa, Mahajanga, and Toliara.

References

sakalava
Endemic flora of Madagascar
Plants described in 1903